"Bela šljiva" (trans. White plum) is the song by the Serbian punk rock band Pekinška Patka, released in 1979, which appeared on the double A-side single with the song "Biti ružan, pametan i mlad". The song, being the first punk rock single released in Serbia, appeared on the band debut album Plitka poezija.

Track listing
Both tracks by Nebojša Čonkić and Sreten Kovačević
 "Biti ružan, pametan i mlad" (1:59)
 "Bela šljiva" (1:56)

Cover versions
 Serbian punk rock band Atheist Rap recorded a cover version of the song as a part of the Pekinška Patka cover versions mix entitled "Plitka poezija".

References
 
 EX YU ROCK enciklopedija 1960-2006, Janjatović Petar; 

1979 singles
1979 songs